Thomas H. Marshall (1826-1861) was an American politician and military commander from Maine. Marshall, a resident of Belfast, Maine and graduate of Bowdoin College, served two terms in the Maine House of Representatives (1857-1858) and two terms in the Maine Senate (1859-1860). During his final term in the Maine Senate, Marshall was elected Senate President. With the outbreak of the American Civil War, Marshall left elected office and became a major in the 4th Maine Volunteer Infantry Regiment, which assembled in Rockland, Maine in May 1861. Marshall was later transferred to the 7th Maine Volunteer Infantry Regiment, where he was at first a lieutenant colonel and later the commanding officer. He became ill with a fever and died in Baltimore along with 80 others in the 7th Maine Regiment.

References

1826 births
1861 deaths
People from Belfast, Maine
Members of the Maine House of Representatives
Presidents of the Maine Senate
People of Maine in the American Civil War
Union Army colonels
Bowdoin College alumni
19th-century American politicians
United States politicians killed during the Civil War